Apteronotus galvisi is a species of ghost knifefish that was first described in a 2007 scientific paper. It is endemic to Colombia. It has a mostly brown body, with some areas of yellow or white.

Named in honor of Germán Galvis Vergara (Universidad Nacional de Colombia, Sede Bogotá).

References

 

Apteronotidae
Freshwater fish of Colombia
Taxa named by Carlos David Canabarro Machado de Santana
Taxa named by Javier Alejandro Maldenado-Ocampo
Taxa named by William Gareth Richard Crampton
Fish described in 2007
Endemic fauna of Colombia